The day–evening–night noise level or L is a 2002 European standard to express noise level over an entire day. It imposes a penalty on sound levels during evening and night and it is primarily used for noise assessments of airports, busy main roads, main railway lines and in cities over 100,000 residents. The penalty for sound production during evenings and nights is due to higher nuisance perception during quieter hours and to prevent sleep deprivation for nearby residents.

Definition
L is calculated as:

Where the long-term average noise levels are defined as:

The exact hours of the three periods may be chosen differently by individual EU member states.

The formula for L can be considered a weighted average of the yearly individual noise level during day, evening and night.

See also
 Environmental noise directive
 Day-night average sound level, the US equivalent

References

Noise
Noise pollution
Audiology
Sounds by type
Urbanization
Urban planning
Acoustics